Sceloporus clarkii, Clark's spiny lizard, is a species of lizard in the family Phrynosomatidae. It is found in New Mexico and Arizona in the United States and Mexico.

Gallery

References

Sceloporus
Reptiles of the United States
Reptiles of Mexico
Reptiles described in 1852
Taxa named by Spencer Fullerton Baird
Taxa named by Charles Frédéric Girard